Nathaniel "Nate" Richard Haden (born March 9, 1976) is an American actor who appeared in several TV shows. His most well known role is "Louis Thomas" in the TV drama series Desire (TV series).

Haden grew up in Lincoln, Nebraska as the oldest of four children. He attended private schools from elementary through high school and then went on to study Business Administration at Nebraska Wesleyan University. Haden currently resides in the Los Angeles, California area with his wife. His most recent spots include short television features on Summerland, C.S.I. Miami & Over There.

On September 26, 2003, Haden married Toni Haden. On November 11, 2006, Haden's wife gave birth to a baby girl.

Filmography
 Meet the Spartans (2008) .... Ryan Seacrest
 Fugly (2007) (TV-Movie) .... Fantasy Husband
 Desire (TV series) (2006) (telenovela) .... Louis Thomas
 My Network TV Premiere Special (2006) .... as himself
 Silver Bells (2005) .... Stake Bed Truck Driver
 Almost Normal (2005) .... Basketball Hunk
 Summerland (2004) .... 'Pretty Boy' Surfer
 CSI: Miami'' (2004) .... Brad Tustin's Love Interest

References

External links

1976 births
American male television actors
American male telenovela actors
Living people
Nebraska Wesleyan University alumni
Actors from Lincoln, Nebraska
Male actors from Nebraska